Dickson may refer to:

People
Dickson (given name)
Dickson (surname)

Places
In Australia:
Dickson, Australian Capital Territory in Canberra
Dickson College in Canberra
Dickson Centre, Australian Capital Territory in Canberra
Division of Dickson, Electoral Division, Queensland

In Canada:
Dickson, Alberta
Dickson Hill, Ontario

In Greenland:
Dickson Fjord

In Malaysia:
Port Dickson

In Russia:

 Dikson (urban-type settlement), Krasnoyarsk Krai (named for Oscar Dickson)

In the United States:
Dickson, Alaska
Dickson, Oklahoma
Dickson, Tennessee
Dickson City, Pennsylvania
Dickson County, Tennessee
Dickson Township, Michigan
Dickson Tavern Erie, PA Historical Building
Dickson, West Virginia

Lakes
Dickson Lake in Argentina and Chile

Literature
Dickson!, a collection of short stories by Gordon R. Dickson

Ships 
 , a cargo ship leased to the Soviet Union during the Second World War

Other 
  a 6-row barley variety
Father Dickson Cemetery, Crestwood, St. Louis County, Missouri

See also
Dikson (disambiguation)
Dixon (disambiguation)